The spin transition is an example of transition between two electronic states in molecular chemistry. The ability of an electron to transit from a stable to another stable (or metastable) electronic state in a reversible and detectable fashion, makes these molecular systems appealing in the field of molecular electronics.

In octahedral surroundings
The ground state is then LS. The HS ground state has got the same multiplicity as the free metal ion.

configurations
The spin transition phenomenon, in fact, was first observed in 1930 for tris (dithiocarbamato) iron(III) compounds. On the other hand, the iron(II) spin transition complexes were the most extensively studied: among these two of them may be considered as archetypes of spin transition systems, namely Fe(NCS)2(bipy)2 and Fe(NCS)2(phen)2 (bipy = 2,2'-bipyridine and phen = 1,10-phenanthroline).

Iron(II) complexes
We discuss the mechanism of the spin transition by focusing on the specific case of iron(II) complexes. At the molecular scale the spin transition corresponds to an interionic electron transfer with spin flip of the transferred electrons. It follows that the average metal-ligand bond length is longer in the HS state than in the LS state. This difference is in the range 1.4–2.4 pm for iron(II) compounds.

To induce a spin transition
Several techniques are currently used to obtain such curves. The simplest method consists of measuring the temperature dependence of molar susceptibility. Any other technique that provides different responses according to whether the state is LS or HS may also be used to determine . Among these techniques, Mössbauer spectroscopy has been particularly useful in the case of iron compounds, showing two well resolved quadrupole doublets. One of these is associated with LS molecules, the other with HS molecules: the high-spin molar fraction then may be deduced from the relative intensities of the doublets.

Types of transition
Various types of transition have been observed. This may be abrupt, occurring within a few kelvins range, or smooth, occurring within a large temperature range. It could also be incomplete both at low temperature and at high temperature, even if the latter is more often observed. Moreover, the  curves may be strictly identical in the cooling or heating modes, or exhibit a hysteresis: in this case the system could assume two different electronic states in a certain range of temperature. Finally the transition may occur in two steps.

See also
 Spin crossover

Quantum chemistry